The 1983–84 Cypriot Second Division was the 29th season of the Cypriot second-level football league. Olympiakos Nicosia won their 1st title.

Format
Fourteen teams participated in the 1983–84 Cypriot Second Division. All teams played against each other twice, once at their home and once away. The team with the most points at the end of the season crowned champions. The first two teams were promoted to 1984–85 Cypriot First Division. The last two teams were relegated to the 1984–85 Cypriot Third Division.

Changes from previous season
Teams promoted to 1983–84 Cypriot First Division
 Ermis Aradippou FC 
 Ethnikos Achna FC

Teams relegated from 1982–83 Cypriot First Division
 Olympiakos Nicosia
 APOP Paphos FC

Teams promoted from 1982–83 Cypriot Third Division
 ENTHOI Lakatamia FC
 Doxa Katokopias FC

Teams relegated to 1983–84 Cypriot Third Division
 Adonis Idaliou
 Othellos Athienou FC

League standings

See also
 Cypriot Second Division
 1983–84 Cypriot First Division
 1983–84 Cypriot Cup

References

Cypriot Second Division seasons
Cyprus
1983–84 in Cypriot football